Contractual Obligation is an EP by punk rock band the Humpers.  It was their last recording for Sympathy for the Record Industry, hence its name.

Track listing
  "Wake Up and Lose"
  "Protex Blue"
  "13 Forever"
  "My Machine"
  "Say Goodbye"
  "Fable of Love"
  "Loser's Club"
  "Fast, Fucked, and Furious"
  "For Lovers Only"

References

The Humpers albums
1996 albums